Banyliv is a village in Vyzhnytsia Raion, Chernivtsi Oblast, Ukraine. It hosts the administration of Banyliv rural hromada, one of the hromadas of Ukraine.

References

Villages in Vyzhnytsia Raion